Rear Admiral Christina M. “Tina” Alvarado was a registered nurse who retired after having served as the deputy chief, Bureau of Medicine and Surgery (BUMED), Reserve Policy and Integration.

She was the first nurse to command Naval Reserve Expeditionary Medical Facility “Dallas One”, the first nurse of Hispanic heritage to be selected to the rank of rear admiral (one star) in the Nurse Corps and the first Hispanic female to achieve the rank of Rear Admiral Upper Half (two star).

Alvarado graduated from the Alexandria Hospital School of Nursing (Alexandria, Virginia), Columbia University School of Nursing, and has a master of health care administration from the University of North Carolina, School of Public Health. In 2019, she was inducted into the National Cowgirl Museum and Hall of Fame. Alvarado breeds American Paint Horses, as well as competing on them. She has three back-to-back American Paint Horse Association World Championships.

References

United States Navy rear admirals
Female admirals of the United States Navy
Columbia University School of Nursing alumni
UNC Gillings School of Global Public Health alumni
Living people
Year of birth missing (living people)
American military nurses
21st-century American women